The  was an army of the Imperial Japanese Army during the final days of World War II.

History
The Japanese 19th Army was created on December 19, 1942 and assigned as a garrison force for the eastern portion of Japanese-occupied Netherlands East Indies from January 7, 1943 under the administrative control of the Southern Expeditionary Army Group. It was headquartered on Ambon. On October 30, 1943, the IJA 19th Army came under the control of the Japanese Second Area Army, a subsidiary of the Kwantung Army as Imperial General Headquarters began planning for a projected invasion of northern Australia.

The projected invasion never occurred, and the IJA 19th Army remained on Ambon, largely cut off from reinforcements and resupply as the Allies bypassed Ambon in their island-hopping campaign in the South West Pacific theatre of World War II. It was demobilized on February 28, 1945 largely without having seen combat.

List of commanders

Commanding Officer

Chief of Staff

References

External links

19
Military units and formations established in 1942
Military units and formations disestablished in 1945